Lyudmyla Olyanovska (born 20 February 1993, in Kyiv) is a Ukrainian race walker.

Career
She won the bronze medal in the 20 kilometer racewalking event at the 2015 World Championships in Athletics in Beijing, China.

In 2014, she won the silver medal in the 20 kilometres racewalking event at the 2014 European Championships in Athletics.

In February 2017, she was disqualified for doping rules violation for four years since 30 November 2015 until 29 November 2019.

National records 

She holds three national records in racewalking:

References

1993 births
Living people
Ukrainian female racewalkers
Sportspeople from Kyiv
World Athletics Championships athletes for Ukraine
World Athletics Championships medalists
European Athletics Championships medalists
Doping cases in athletics
Ukrainian sportspeople in doping cases
Athletes (track and field) at the 2020 Summer Olympics
20th-century Ukrainian women
21st-century Ukrainian women